Ferren is a given name and surname. Notable people with the name include:

Carlyle Ferren MacIntyre (1890–1967), American poet
Charles Ferren Hopkins (1842–1934), American Civil War soldier
André Ferren (born 1943), French rugby league player
Bran Ferren (born 1953), American technologist
John Ferren (1905–1970),  American artist and educator
John M. Ferren (born 1937), American judge

See also
Ferran (surname)
Ferrin, given name and surname